Przywodzie may refer to the following places:
Przywodzie, Choszczno County in West Pomeranian Voivodeship (north-west Poland)
Przywodzie, Gmina Lipiany in West Pomeranian Voivodeship (north-west Poland)
Przywodzie, Gmina Przelewice in West Pomeranian Voivodeship (north-west Poland)